Peripetoceras is a genus in the Clydonautilacean family, Liroceratidae. It can be recognized by its smooth, involute shell with a deep small umbilicus with rounded shoulders and steep convex wall;  whorl section with flattened venter, rounded ventral shoulders and convergent slightly convex flanks; suture with slight ventral and lateral lobes; and small siphuncle located dorsally of the center.

Peripetoceras ranges from the Lower Carboniferous (Upper Mississippian) to the Permian and has been found in Europe (England and Germany), Russia and China.

References

Bernhard Kummel, 1964. Nautiloidea -Nautilida; Treatise on Invertebrate Paleontology, Part K. Geol Soc of America and Univ  of Kansas press, R.C. Moore (ed) -- Liroceratidae K444 -K447.

Nautiloids
Permian cephalopods
Carboniferous cephalopods
Mississippian first appearances
Permian genus extinctions
Carboniferous animals of Europe
Fossils of Germany
Kupferschiefer
Fossil taxa described in 1894